Claes Turitz (28 August 1928 – 1 April 2005) was a Swedish sailor who competed in the 1960 Summer Olympics.

References

1928 births
2005 deaths
Swedish male sailors (sport)
Olympic sailors of Sweden
Sailors at the 1960 Summer Olympics – 5.5 Metre